Tsigareli is cabbage with fresh tomato, red spicy peppers, potatoes and herbs like dill and parsley. It is a dish found mostly in Corfu.

References

Cuisine of the Ionian Islands
Culture of Corfu